The State of New York has a large network of multi-use paths, rail trails, hiking trails, and other facilities. Many are short, local paths, but many are of statewide or regional significance. In order to be added to this list, a trail must be located in New York and have and its own article, or a dedicated section in an article.

Long-distance hiking trails

 Appalachian Trail
 Empire State Trail
 Finger Lakes Trail
 Long Path
 Northville-Placid Trail
 Taconic Crest Trail
 Van Hoevenberg Trail

Rail trails

 Albany County Rail Trail
 Allegheny River Valley Trail
 Auburn Trail
 Canalway Trail
 Cato–Fair Haven Trail
 Catskill Scenic Trail
 Dutchess Rail Trail
 Genesee Valley Greenway
 Harlem Valley Rail Trail
 High Line
 Hojack Trail Cayuga
 Hojack Trail Webster
 Hudson Valley Rail Trail
 Kings Park Hike and Bike Trail
 Mohawk Hudson Bike/Hike Trail
 North County Trailway
 Orange Heritage Trailway
 Oswego Recreational Trail
 Poughkeepsie Bridge
 Putnam County Trailway
 Rutland Trail
 South County Trailway
 Walden–Wallkill Rail Trail
 Wallkill Valley Rail Trail
 Zim Smith Trail

Other trails

Although many of the multi-use paths in New York are converted rail trails, there are some significant examples that were never railroads.

 List of trails on Long Island, New York
 Trails in Ithaca, New York
 Manhattan Waterfront Greenway
 Brooklyn-Queens Greenway
 Blue Disc Trail (Harriman State Park)
 Groff Creek
 New York State Canalway Trail
 Erie Canal Trail
 Wilkinson Memorial Trail

Snowmobile trails
List of snowmobile trails in New York

External links
Capital District Regional Bike-Hike Map
2004 Mohawk-Hudson Bike-Hike Trail Map
New York state trails (NYS OPRHP)

Transportation in New York (state)
 
 
Trails
Trails

References